Lawka Dewi Mwei Auk was a principal queen consort of King Razadarit of Hanthawaddy Pegu from 1392 to 1421.

Brief
According to the Razadarit Ayedawbon chronicle, the queen was the middle daughter of Saw Ye-Bein, a senior minister at the Hanthawaddy court. Her personal name was Mwei Auk (မွေ့အောက်). She had an elder sister Mwei Ohn-Naung and  a younger sister Mi U-Si In April 1392, she became a senior queen of King Razadarit, with the title of Lawka Dewi. Her two sisters were also raised as queens at the same ceremony.

She and her sisters were first cousins once removed of the king. Their father was a first cousin of Razadarit. Their paternal grandfather Binnya Thein was a noble from Chiang Mai who after a disagreement with the king of Chiang Mai had sought refuge at the court of King Binnya U. Their paternal grandmother was Tala Saw Lun, a daughter of King Saw Zein.

Ancestry

Notes

References

Bibliography
 

Queens consort of Hanthawaddy